Ruth P. Fitzgerald (born 1956) is a New Zealand anthropology academic, and as of 2019 is a full professor at the University of Otago.

Academic career

After a 1999 PhD titled Who cares? : an ethnographic investigation of the meaning of care at the University of Otago, Fitzgerald joined the staff, rising to full professor in 2018. In 2015 Fitzgerald was awarded the Royal Society of New Zealand's Te Rangi Hiroa Medal. Her work covers the social and political context of many health issues, such as the ethics of reversing heritable deafness or terminating pregnancy.

In 2017, Fitzgerald was selected as one of the Royal Society Te Apārangi's "150 women in 150 words", celebrating the contributions of women to knowledge in New Zealand.

Selected works 
 
 Fitzgerald, Ruth P., W. Murray Thomson, C. T. Schafer, and M. A. Loose. "An exploratory qualitative study of Otago adolescents' views of oral health and oral health care." The New Zealand Dental Journal 100, no. 3 (2004): 62–71.

References

External links
  

New Zealand women academics
Academic staff of the University of Otago
University of Otago alumni
New Zealand anthropologists
New Zealand women anthropologists
1956 births
Living people
21st-century New Zealand women writers